Ashur-nadin-ahhe I (Aššur-nādin-aḫḫē I) was a king of Assyria in the 15th century BC. He took power after the death of his father, Ashur-rabi I. During his reign, Assyria became a sporadic vassal of Mitanni. He was overthrown by his brother Enlil-Nasir II.

A letter survives from him congratulating Egyptian Pharaoh Thutmose III on his victories in Palestine and Syria.

Notes

References

15th-century BC Assyrian kings
Leaders ousted by a coup
Year of birth unknown
Year of death unknown